The Jean Baptiste Bergeron House  in Pointe Coupee Parish, Louisiana was built in c.1840.  It was listed on the National Register of Historic Places in 1994.

It is a brick and frame plantation house built in the French Creole style. It is on the Chenal Road (Louisiana Highway 414) between the communities of Jarreau and Chenal.

References

Houses on the National Register of Historic Places in Louisiana
Houses completed in 1840
Pointe Coupee Parish, Louisiana
Plantations in Louisiana